The Million Cities is a science fiction novel  by Scottish writer J. T. McIntosh, published  in August 1958 in Satellite Science Fiction in somewhat shorter form, and subsequently in full in both the US and the UK.  A second edition was printed in August 1963.

Plot summary

Sometime in the future when the Earth has become over-industrialized, and the entire surface has been covered with steel, it is on the verge of running out of natural resources.   Nearly all of the Earth's resources have been used up; a single park in the Earth's equatorial region remains.   The world's governments have built as far up and down as is possible.   Billions upon billions of people live on the Earth, and the only place left to go is outer space.   There is a society called Chartists that have the plans for building spaceships, and the maps of the heavens are in their sole custody.   Gearing up for an all out massive development suitable an exodus, the government suddenly reverses itself, and issues an order to arrest all the Chartists, disassemble their ships and launchpads, and destroy all copies of the plans.

External links
 

1958 science fiction novels
1958 British novels
British science fiction novels
Overpopulation fiction
Pyramid Books books